Onks' Viljoo näkyny? (English translated "Has anyone seen Viljo?") is a 1988 Finnish comedy film directed by Hannu Seikkula. The film is based on Heikki Kinnunen's sketch from the ÄWPK – Älywapaa palokunta sketch show that was shown in 1984–1985. In addition to Kinnunen, the film stars Aake Kalliala and Pirkka-Pekka Petelius.

A total of 75,320 viewers watched the film in cinemas in 1988.

Plot
The events begin with TV show presenter Uffa Hintman's (Heikki Kinnunen) announcement that he will pay ten million Finnish marks to whoever makes famous Taka-Surkee, the small village in the middle of nowhere. This information sets in motion Chamberlain Vähänen (Kinnunen), two Romani men Valtte (Aake Kalliala) and Arvid (Pirkka-Pekka Petelius), two Sámi men Naema-Aslak (Petelius) and Soikiapää (Kalliala), and, of course, several people from Taka-Surkee. Many also come up with the idea of robbing the prize money that Hintman keeps in his safe. The man with a cigarette and Koskenkorva bottle (Kinnunen), on the other hand, is content to just ask after Viljo from everyone who meets him.

Cast
Heikki Kinnunen as Uffa Hintman / Group manager Vähänen / Constable Unto Kutvonen / The man asking about Viljo / Urho
Aake Kalliala as Lempo Römppäinen / Soikiapää / Arvid / Marko / Buffalo-Bill
Pirkka-Pekka Petelius as Erkki Nyysteen / Mailman Uutela / Naema-Aslak / Valtte / Leo / Napoleon
Titta Jokinen as Hulta Römppäinen
Kristiina Elstelä as Mrs. Nyysteen
Anna Hultin as Pamela Kutiainen
Klaus Thomasson as Newscaster Kari Vaivanen
Vesa Vierikko as Doctor
Tauno Lahtinen as Tane, Police
Aija Rikala as Announcer

References

External links

1988 films
Spede Pasanen
1988 comedy films
1980s Finnish-language films
Finnish comedy films